In algebraic geometry and the theory of complex manifolds, a logarithmic differential form is a differential form with poles of a certain kind. The concept was introduced by Pierre Deligne. In short, logarithmic differentials have the mildest possible singularities needed in order to give information about an open submanifold (the complement of the divisor of poles). (This idea is made precise by several versions of de Rham's theorem discussed below.)

Let X be a complex manifold, D ⊂ X a reduced divisor (a sum of distinct codimension-1 complex subspaces), and ω a holomorphic p-form on X−D. If both ω and dω have a pole of order at most 1 along D, then ω is said to have a logarithmic pole along D. ω is also known as a logarithmic p-form. The p-forms with log poles along D form a subsheaf of the meromorphic p-forms on X, denoted

The name comes from the fact that in complex analysis, ; here  is a typical example of a 1-form on the complex numbers C with a logarithmic pole at the origin. Differential forms such as  make sense in a purely algebraic context, where there is no analog of the logarithm function.

Logarithmic de Rham complex

Of special interest is the case where D has normal crossings: that is, D is locally a sum of codimension-1 complex submanifolds that intersect transversely. In this case, the sheaf of logarithmic differential forms is the subalgebra of  generated by the holomorphic differential forms  together with the 1-forms  for holomorphic functions  that are nonzero outside D. Note that

Then, for any , the vector bundle  is the kth exterior power,

Logarithmic differentials and singular cohomology
Let X be a complex manifold and D a divisor with normal crossings on X. Deligne proved a holomorphic analog of de Rham's theorem in terms of logarithmic differentials. Namely,

where the left side denotes the cohomology of X with coefficients in a complex of sheaves, sometimes called hypercohomology. This follows from the natural inclusion of complexes of sheaves

being a quasi-isomorphism.

Logarithmic differentials in algebraic geometry

There is an exact sequence of coherent sheaves on X:

where  is the inclusion of an irreducible component of D. Here β is called the residue map; so this sequence says that a 1-form with log poles along D is regular (that is, has no poles) if and only if its residues are zero. More generally, for any p ≥ 0, there is an exact sequence of coherent sheaves on X:
 
where the sums run over all irreducible components of given dimension of intersections of the divisors Dj. Here again, β is called the residue map.

for any regular -form . Some authors define the residue by saying that  has residue , which differs from the definition here by the sign .

Example of the residue
In this context, the residue may be called the Poincaré residue.

There is a meromorphic 2-form on  given in affine coordinates by

which has log poles along D. Because the canonical bundle  is isomorphic to the line bundle , the divisor of poles of  must have degree 3. So the divisor of poles of  consists only of D (in particular,  does not have a pole along the line  at infinity). The residue of ω along D is given by the holomorphic 1-form

The residue map  considered here is part of a linear map , which may be called the "Gysin map". This is part of the Gysin sequence associated to any smooth divisor D in a complex manifold X:

Historical terminology
In the 19th-century theory of elliptic functions, 1-forms with logarithmic poles were sometimes called integrals of the second kind (and, with an unfortunate inconsistency, sometimes differentials of the third kind). For example, the Weierstrass zeta function associated to a lattice  in C was called an "integral of the second kind" to mean that it could be written

Mixed Hodge theory for smooth varieties
Over the complex numbers, Deligne proved a strengthening of Alexander Grothendieck's algebraic de Rham theorem, relating coherent sheaf cohomology with singular cohomology. Namely, for any smooth scheme X over C with a divisor with simple normal crossings D, there is a natural isomorphism

for each integer k, where the groups on the left are defined using the Zariski topology and the groups on the right use the classical (Euclidean) topology.

Moreover, when X is smooth and proper over C, the resulting spectral sequence

This is part of the mixed Hodge structure which Deligne defined on the cohomology of any complex algebraic variety. The resulting filtration on  can be constructed using the logarithmic de Rham complex. Namely, define an increasing filtration  by

The resulting filtration on cohomology is the weight filtration:

Building on these results, Hélène Esnault and Eckart Viehweg generalized the Kodaira–Akizuki–Nakano vanishing theorem in terms of logarithmic differentials. Namely, let X be a smooth complex projective variety of dimension n, D a divisor with simple normal crossings on X, and L an ample line bundle on X. Then

and

for all .

See also
Adjunction formula
Borel–Moore homology
Differential of the first kind
Log structure
Mixed Hodge structure
Residue theorem
Poincaré residue

Notes

References

External links
Aise Johan de Jong, Algebraic de Rham cohomology.

Complex analysis
Algebraic geometry